Nicolas Agnesi (born September 9, 1988, in Draguignan (Var)) is a French rugby union plyer, who plays as left prop for Pau club (1.84 m, 111 kg).

He joined the "pôle espoir à Marcoussis" for the 2006 in rugby union.

Career 

 Until 2006 : Draguignan
 2006-2010 : RC Toulon
 Since 2010 : Section paloise

Honours

Club 

 Pro D2 Champions : 2008

National team 
 France U20 : Took part in the World Championships in Wales, 4 caps as starter.
 France U20 : Took part in the Six Nations 2008, 3 caps as starter
 France U19 : Took part in the World Championships in 2007 in rugby union in Belfast, 4 caps as starter
 France U18 : Took part in the World Championships 2006 in rugby union

External links 

  Player profile at lequipe.fr
  Statistics at itsrugby.fr

French rugby union players
Rugby union props
Sportspeople from Var (department)
1988 births
RC Toulonnais players
Living people
US Montauban players